Olafia is a genus of skippers in the family Hesperiidae.
It contains only one species, Olafia roscius, which is found in Brazil and Argentina.

Subspecies
 O. roscius roscius (Hopffer, 1874) (Brazil, Argentina)
 O. roscius flavomaculata (Bell, 1937) (Brazil: Santa Catarina)
 O. roscius iphimedia (Plötz, 1886) (Brazil)

Etymology
The genus is named in honour of entomologist Olaf H.H. Mielke.

References

External links 
Natural History Museum Lepidoptera genus database

Pyrrhopygini
Hesperiidae of South America
Hesperiidae genera